Charlotte Fich (born 26 September 1961) is a Danish stage, film and television actress. She is most often recognized for her role as police officer Ingrid Dahl in the Emmy awarded (2002) Danish television series Unit One (Danish: Rejseholdet) (2000–2004). She is married to Danish film director Per Fly.

Filmography
Black Widows (2016–2017)
All for One (2011)
Hold Me Tight (2010)
Headhunter (2009)
Worlds Apart (2008)
Kærlighed på film (Just Another Love Story) (2007)
Manslaughter (2005)
Kinamand (2005)
Som man behager (2003)
Se dagens lys (2003)
Rejseholdet (2000–2003)
Pas på mor (1999)
Deadline (1998)
Det store flip (1997)
Taxa (1997)
Kalder Katrine (1993)
Jul i Juleland (1993)

Awards
 2005: Bodil award for best supporting actress, Manslaughter
 2005: Robert award for best supporting actress, Manslaughter
 2007: Bodil award for best supporting actress, Just Another Love Story
 2007: Zulu award for best supporting actress, Just Another Love Story

External links

1961 births
Living people
Danish film actresses
Best Supporting Actress Bodil Award winners